The Cracker Factory is an American television film directed by Burt Brinckerhoff. The teleplay by Richard Shapiro is based on the best-selling 1977 novel by Joyce Rebeta-Burditt. The film was broadcast by ABC on March 16, 1979.

Synopsis
Alcoholic Cleveland housewife Cassie Barrett is institutionalized in a psychiatric ward after experiencing a nervous breakdown in the supermarket. We learn this is the latest in a series of hospitalizations from which Cassie emerges supposedly in control of her life but actually still teetering on the edge. During this latest stay, she develops a romantic crush on psychiatrist Edwin Alexander and a close relationship with night supervisor Tinkerbell, both of whom help her take steps toward facing her inner demons and learning to live with sobriety.

Principal cast
 Natalie Wood as Cassie Barrett
 Perry King as Dr. Edwin Alexander
 Shelley Long as Cara
 Juliet Mills as Tinkerbell
 Peter Haskell as Charlie Barrett
 Vivian Blaine as Helen
 Marian Mercer as Eleanor

Production
Wood was signed in December 1978.

See also
 List of television films produced for American Broadcasting Company

References

External links
 The Cracker Factory at the Internet Movie Database

1979 television films
1979 films
American television films
1979 drama films
ABC network original films
Films set in Cleveland
Films set in psychiatric hospitals
Films scored by Billy Goldenberg
Films based on American novels
Films directed by Burt Brinckerhoff